George Hubbard Makgill, 13th Viscount of Oxfuird,  (7 January 1934 – 3 January 2003), was a Scottish peer and Chief of the Makgill family. He inherited his titles from his uncle.

Oxfuird was a deputy speaker and deputy chair of committees in the House of Lords. He was one of the 92 hereditary peers who were elected in 1999 to continue as members of the Lords when most of the hereditary peers lost their seats.

Family
Lord Oxfuird married twice. His first wife, Alison Jensen, bore him four sons (including a set of twins), one of whom died two days after birth:

 Richard Makgill (born and died 1967)
 Ian Alexander Arthur Makgill, 14th Viscount of Oxfuird (born 1969)
 Hon. Robert Edward George Makgill (1969–2015)
 Hon. Hamish Max Alastair Makgill (born 1972)

Makgill and his second wife, Venetia Steward, had one son:

 Hon. Edward Anthony Donald Makgill (born 1983)

References

External links

1934 births
2003 deaths
Commanders of the Order of the British Empire
Viscounts in the Peerage of Scotland

Hereditary peers elected under the House of Lords Act 1999